The Original Soundtrack to the film South Pacific was released in 1958. The film was based on the 1949 musical South Pacific by Rodgers and Hammerstein. The composers had much say in this recording, with many of the songs performed by accomplished singers rather than the actors in the film. Mitzi Gaynor and Ray Walston (who had played Luther Billis in the original national tour and in the original London production) were the only two leading performers who did their own singing in the film (and on the soundtrack album).  The roles of Emile DeBecque, Bloody Mary and Joe Cable were sung by Giorgio Tozzi, Muriel Smith (who had played the role in the original London production) and Bill Lee, respectively.

The album became a major success, reaching No.1 in both the US and UK. In the US, the album stayed at No.1 for seven months - the fourth longest run ever.  In the UK, the album remained in the top five for 27 consecutive weeks before reaching No.1 in November 1958. It stayed at the top for a record-breaking 115 weeks (the first 70 of these consecutively—including the whole year of 1959), and remained in the top five for 214 weeks. As of 2006, the album has sold 1,803,681 copies in United Kingdom.

Track listing 
The songs on the soundtrack LP and CD are arranged in the order that they appear in the Broadway musical, not in the order in which they appear in the film.

Side One
 "South Pacific Overture" (3:03)
 "Dites-moi" (1:19)
 "A Cockeyed Optimist" (1:45)
 "Twin Soliloquies" / "Some Enchanted Evening" (5:53)
 "Bloody Mary" (1:57)
 "My Girl Back Home" (1:42)
 "There Is Nothin' Like a Dame" (3:50)
 "Bali Ha'i" (3:41)
Side Two
 "I'm Gonna Wash That Man Right Outa My Hair" (2:56)
 "I'm in Love with a Wonderful Guy" (3:23)
 "Younger Than Springtime" (4:59)
 "Happy Talk" (3:46)
 "Honey Bun" (1:48)
 "You've Got to Be Carefully Taught" (1:15)
 "This Nearly Was Mine" (2:12)
 "Finale" (2:58)

Chart positions

Certifications and sales

References 

Film scores
1958 albums
RCA Records soundtracks

Various artists albums